These are the statistics of Uruguayan side River Plate collected among Primera División Uruguaya seasons, Copa Conmebol, Copa Sudamericana and Copa Libertadores.

Performance in Primera División

Matches in Primera División

Last update on Oct 8, 2022

Matches in Torneo Intermedio

Last update on Ago 2, 2022

Performance in CONMEBOL competitions

Copa Libertadores 
 1 appearance (2016)
 Best: group stage (2016)

Matches in Copa Libertadores

Copa Sudamericana 
 8 appearances (2008, 2009, 2010, 2013, 2014, 2019, 2020 and 2022)
 Best: semifinals (2009)

Matches in Copa Sudamericana

Copa CONMEBOL 
 2 appearances (1996 and 1998)
 Best: quarterfinals (1996)

Matches in Copa Conmebol

References

River Plate Montevideo